This article lists the royal consorts of monarchs of Thailand from the foundation of the Sukhothai Kingdom in 1238 until the present day.

Sukhothai Kingdom

Phra Ruang Dynasty

Ayutthaya Kingdom

Uthong Dynasty

Suphannaphum Dynasty

Sukhothai Dynasty

Prasat Thong Dynasty

Ban Phlu Luang Dynasty

Thonburi Kingdom

Thonburi Dynasty

Rattanakosin Kingdom

Chakri Dynasty

References

External links

 
Royal consorts
Thailand, Queen Consorts of
Thai